Stephen Vincent Ryan, C.M. (January 1, 1825 – April 10, 1896) was a Canadian-born American prelate of the Catholic Church. A member of the Congregation of the Mission, he served as Bishop of Buffalo from 1868 until his death in 1896.

Biography

Early life
Ryan was born on New Year's Day 1825 in Almonte, Ontario, to Martin and Margaret (née McCarthy) Ryan. His parents were natives of Ireland who lived in Sixmilebridge before immigrating to Canada, and Ryan was the fifth of their nine children. At his baptism, the priest is alleged to have remarked, "This child will command an army yet." When he was three years old, the family moved to Pottsville, Pennsylvania. He was confirmed by the visiting Mexican bishop Joaquín Fernández de Madrid y Canal in 1835 and then took the name Vincent.

Ryan entered St. Charles Borromeo Seminary in Philadelphia at age 15 to begin his studies for the priesthood. After the accession of a Vincentian rector at the seminary, he decided to join that religious order and enrolled at St. Mary's Seminary of the Barrens in Perryville, Missouri. He made his profession as a Vincentian on May 6, 1846.

Priesthood
Ryan was ordained a priest on June 24, 1849 by Archbishop Peter Richard Kenrick in St. Louis. He remained at the Barrens until 1851, when he became a professor at St. Vincent's College in Cape Girardeau. He was elevated to president of the college in 1856. The following year, Ryan was appointed Visitor, or head, of the Vincentian community in the United States. At the time, he was only 32 years old and but eight years a priest. Upon meeting Ryan, Cardinal Alessandro Barnabò of the Congregation for the Propagation of the Faith supposedly exclaimed, "What young men they make Visitors in America!"

During his 11 years as Visitor (1857-1868), Ryan guided the community through the difficult days of the Civil War. At this time there were 57 priests, 40 brothers, ten scholastics, and seven novices. In one of his final acts as Visitor, he transferred the provincial headquarters from St. Louis to the Germantown neighborhood of Philadelphia in 1867.

Bishop of Buffalo
Ryan's fellow Vincentian, Bishop John Timon of the Diocese of Buffalo, New York, died in April 1867. On March 3, 1868, Ryan was appointed to succeed Timon as the second Bishop of Buffalo by Pope Pius IX. He initially refused to accept the position and returned his letter of appointment to Rome, but he eventually conceded. He received his episcopal consecration on November 8, 1868 from Archbishop John McCloskey, with Bishops John Loughlin and John Lynch serving as co-consecrators, at St. Joseph's Cathedral in Buffalo. 

From 1869 to 1870, he participated in the First Vatican Council. Ryan unified the Catholic school system in the diocese and established a commission to supervise it He founded the diocesan newspaper called The Catholic Union. He also engaged in a public controversy with Arthur Coxe, the Episcopal Bishop of Western New York, over the issue of apostolic succession.

Ryan died on April 10, 1896 in Buffalo at age 71.  He was interred next to Bishop John Timon at St. Joseph's Cathedral. His tenure as Bishop spanned 28 years, the longest in the history of the Buffalo Diocese.

References

External links
  Bishops of Buffalo, NY

1825 births
1896 deaths
Pre-Confederation Canadian emigrants to the United States
19th-century Roman Catholic bishops in the United States
Roman Catholic bishops of Buffalo
American Roman Catholic clergy of Irish descent
People from Almonte, Ontario
Vincentian bishops
St. Charles Borromeo Seminary alumni